The Pro Patria Milano (sometimes known by sponsor names Pro Patria Pierrel or Pro Patria Freedent) is an Italian athletics club based in Milan, founded in 1883.

Achievements
Pro Patria Milano won 12 editions of the men's Italian Championships in Athletics for clubs (Campionati italiani di società di atletica leggera), and two edition of European Champion Clubs Cup.
13 wins at the Italian Championships (1935, 1937, 1938, 1939, 1940, 1941, 1942, 1983, 1984, 1985, 1987, 1990)
2 wins at the European Champion Clubs Cup (1984, 1985)

Main athletes

Luigi Beccali
Giovanni Turba
Pierfrancesco Pavoni
Alberto Cova
Mario Lanzi
Carlo Simionato
Enrico Perucconi
Salvatore Morale
Eddy Ottoz
Giovanni Evangelisti

See also
Athletics in Italy
Aurora Pro Patria 1919

References

External links
 Official site

Athletics clubs in Italy